Taean is a ward in Namp'o Special City, South P'yŏngan province, North Korea.

Administrative divisions
Taean District is divided into 8 tong (neighbourhoods) and 3 ri (villages):

Transportation
Taean District is served by the Taean Line of the Korean State Railway.

References

Districts of Nampo